William Steinkamp (born June 9, 1953) is an American film editor with more than 20 film credits. He had a longstanding, notable collaboration with director Sydney Pollack, editing nearly all of Pollack's films from Tootsie (1982) through the director's last film, The Interpreter (2005).

Relative assistance

Steinkamp's first credits are as an assistant editor to his father, Fredric Steinkamp, on two of Pollack's films in the late 1970s. From 1980 on, Steinkamp co-edited most of Pollack's films with his father; after his father's retirement in 1995, William Steinkamp became Pollack's principal editor through the end of the latter's career in 2005. Steinkamp has edited several of director Gary Fleder's films, from Kiss the Girls (1997) through The Express (2008).

Awards

Steinkamp has been nominated for the Academy Award for Film Editing for editing two films directed by Pollack, Tootsie (1982), and Out of Africa (1985); Fredric Steinkamp was also nominated for these films. He was again nominated as sole editor for The Fabulous Baker Boys (directed by Steve Kloves, 1989). He has been nominated for ACE Eddie awards for editing Tootsie (1982), Out of Africa (1985), and Scent of a Woman (directed by Martin Brest - 1992).

Steinkamp has been selected for membership in the American Cinema Editors.

See also
List of film director and editor collaborations

References

External links 

 

American Cinema Editors
1953 births
Living people
American film editors